Milan Đurić (born October 3, 1987 in Belgrade) is a Serbian football midfielder who plays for Javor-Matis in the Serbia.

Career
Đurić has played with Serbian clubs BPI Pekar and Beograd in his early career. During the winter break of the 2008–09 season he moved to Macedonian First League side Metalurg Skopje.

Being the main playmaker in Metalurg, he was voted by the Football Federation of Macedonia as the best foreign player in the Macedonian First League for the year 2010. In season 2010-2011 Metalurg won Macedonian Cup, finished runners-up in the league, and played qualifications for UEFA Europa League.

In summer 2011 he moved to Poland and started playing for Sandecja Nowy Sącz, but at the beginning of season's second half, he changed club and became a member of Radnik Bijeljina. A few months later Radnik won the First League of the Republika Srpska and Milan Djurić was named the best player.

In summer 2012 he returned to Serbia, this time by joining top-league side Jagodina. He helped Jagodina win the 2012–13 Serbian Cup by scoring the only goal in the Final against Vojvodina.

After three years in Jagodina, he moved abroad again in the summer of 2015, joining the Croatian side Istra 1961.

On 25 June 2016, Đurić signed a two-year contract with Zira.

On 16 June 2018, Đurić returned to Serbia, signing with Vojvodina.

On 8 August 2019, Đurić was announced as a new signing of A-League team Central Coast Mariners. He left the Mariners at the end of the 2019–20 A-League in September 2020. He was the top scorer in his season at the Mariners.

Honours
Metalurg Skopje
Macedonian Cup: 2010–11

Radnik Bijeljina
First League of the Republika Srpska: 2011–12

Jagodina
Serbian Cup: 2012–13

Individual
Macedonian First League Best Foreign Player: 2009–10
First League of the Republika Srpska Best Player: 2011–12

References

External links
 
 Profile at SLAgency
 Đurić: Jagodina može do samog vrha
 

1987 births
Living people
Serbian footballers
Serbian expatriate footballers
FK Obilić players
FK Metalurg Skopje players
Sandecja Nowy Sącz players
FK Radnik Bijeljina players
Expatriate footballers in North Macedonia
Association football midfielders
Expatriate footballers in Poland
Serbian expatriate sportspeople in North Macedonia
Serbian expatriate sportspeople in Poland
Serbian expatriate sportspeople in Azerbaijan
FK Jagodina players
Serbian SuperLiga players
NK Istra 1961 players
Zira FK players
Azerbaijan Premier League players
FK Vojvodina players
Central Coast Mariners FC players
A-League Men players
Expatriate footballers in Azerbaijan